Henning Waldemar Karlsson (20 May 1897 – 21 May 1978) was a Swedish long-distance runner. He competed in the marathon at the 1924 Summer Olympics.

References

External links
 

1897 births
1978 deaths
Athletes (track and field) at the 1924 Summer Olympics
Swedish male long-distance runners
Swedish male marathon runners
Olympic athletes of Sweden
Athletes from Stockholm